Lecidoma is a genus of lichenized fungi in the Lecideaceae family. It is a monotypic genus, containing the single species Lecidoma demissum.

References

External links
Lecidoma at Index Fungorum

Lichen genera
Lecideales genera
Lecideales
Taxa named by Hannes Hertel